In the period from 1918 to 1935 of the young Soviet Union any "bourgeois" military ideas were put under general suspicion by the communists, the new political establishment. Among others, the old Russian tradition of wearing epaulets and shoulder straps as rank insignia was rigorously abolished and was replaced with a new tradition of rank designations and insignia for the new Red Army and the nascent Soviet Navy.

Initial insignia 

In the early period of the October revolution new uniforms were used and new units structured on the basis of the former Imperial Russian Army and Navy. The levelling of military grades and neglecting of rank designation were symptomatic of the new order. The first common rank designation throughout the Red Army was "Red Army man" or, in the Workers' and Peasants' Red Navy, "Red Fleet man".

Personnel designated to command a military unit were unofficially named "red commander" (Russian: красный командир; krasnyi komandir, abbreviated краском; kraskom). Commanders of major units (army or corps sized) were designated "army commander" (Russian: командующий армией; komanduyushchy armyye; abbreviated командарм; komandarm). For more detailed graduation komandarm I and komandarm II were adopted.

Commanding officers of major units below army and corps level were known as:
 Commander of a division: 
 Commander of a brigade: 

In the navy from December 1917 until 1918, naval officers of the Imperial Russian Navy who joined its ranks were addressed by their tsarist rank with the addition of front abbreviation "b.", which meant "former", while new officers had to wait until 1924 for their rank designations to be issued.

With no formal Red Army insignia designated, red bows, cap peaks, sleeve patches and the red star were worn, first by the so-called Red Guard units, later by all other Red Army units. In 1920 all the ranks and rank insignia of the Red Army and Navy were regulated by the orders of the Defence Commissar, Leon Trotsky.

Red star 
The first official emblem of the Red Army was a chest badge (red textile bend and oak leaves twig, in the middle a star with sickle and hammer), introduced in April 1918. From summer of the same year the cap cockade, in form of a five-pointed star with hammer and sickle, was designated. At first two of the points were uppermost, before it was directed that a single point of the star should face the 12 o'clock position.

By orders number 953 and 1691 of the Revolutionary Military Council of the Red Army on structure and design of the cap cockade in shape of a red star, the official design was introduced for use by all personnel of the Red Army.

Army ranks (1918–1924) 
By order from April 25, 1918, of the "People's Commissar for Military and Naval Affairs" a temporary committee was established, to develop proposals pertaining to the uniform of the Red Guards.
On November 29, 1918, the All-Russian Central Executive Committee approved these proposals and agreed to the rank designations as follows to be used, by both the Red Guards and the Red Army's ground forces as a whole:

On December 18, 1918, the Revolutionary Military Committee agreed upon the new uniforms proposed and the ranks. Among other three versions of caps and various rank insignia were adopted, in order to emphasize several appointments. It was followed by the official approval by order number 116 of the "Revolutionary Military Committee" from January 16, 1919 (see pictures 1 to 11). The ground forces of the Red Army and the nascent Soviet Air Force used these ranks until 1924.

Naval ranks (1921–1924) 
With the definite beginning of the rehabilitation of the Soviet Navy in 1923–24 came the introduction of rank appointments for ratings and officers of the Navy. These ranks, however, began to be used during the Civil War years and were sanctioned in 1921.

 Red Fleetman  (original designation: Krasnoflotez)
 Boatswain/Starshina (Botsman/Starshina)
 Squad leader ( – short: Komot/ Otdeljonnyj komandir)
 Group commander ( – short: Komgrup)
 Combatant Commander ( – Kombocha)
 Assistant Ship Commander ( – Pomkomkor)
 Senior assistant ship commander ( – Stapomkomkor)
 Ship Commander ( – Komkor)
 Naval Battalion Commander ( – Komdivzkor)
 Naval Brigade commander ( – Kombrikor)
 Naval Division chief ( – short: Nachdivkor)
 Chief of Naval Forces of the USSR ( SSSR – Nachmorsi SSSR)

Uniform insignia followed the traditions of the Imperial Navy but with sleeve insignia for officers and all ratings, but the uniform itself remained the same as its Imperial Russian predecessors.

Distinction insignia and ranks (1924–1935) 
The following ranks were used by the Soviet military from 1924 to 1935. The new ranks came as a result of new People's Commisariat for Defense regulations concerning military ranks and appointments.

Army and air force ranks

Top commanders

Higher and medium commanders

Low commanders and enlisted men

Navy

Top commanders

Higher and medium commanders

Low commanders and enlisted men 

The rank of Marshal of the Soviet Union, created in September 1935, took first precedence over all ranks since then. With the new Marshal rank being introduced, the Council of People's Commissars began the process of phrasing out the 1924 rank system.

See also 
 History of Russian military ranks
 Ranks and insignia of the Imperial Russian Armed Forces
 Military ranks of the Soviet Union (1935–1940)
 Military ranks of the Soviet Union (1940–1943)
 Military ranks of the Soviet Union (1943–1955)
 Military ranks of the Soviet Union (1955–1991)
 Ranks and rank insignia of the Russian Federation's armed forces 1994–2010
 Army ranks and insignia of the Russian Federation
 Naval ranks and insignia of the Russian Federation

References 

 

Military ranks of Russia
Russian Federation Army
Military ranks of the Soviet Union